The Kungur is a river in Perm Krai, Russia, a right tributary of the Iren, which in turn is a tributary of the Sylva. Main tributaries: Kormilovka (left), Gryaznukha (right).

References 

Rivers of Perm Krai